Sydney bus route 144 is operated by Keolis Downer Northern Beaches between Manly wharf and Chatswood station. It was Sydney's first government operated bus route.

History 
In the late 1920s, White Transit Company commenced operating route 144 between Manly wharf and Cremorne Junction where it connected with tram services. It ceased on 31 October 1931, when White Transit Company were forced out of business by the Transport (Co-ordination) Act 1931 with its services deemed to be in competition with tram services, which the act prohibited.

On 25 December 1932, the service was recommenced by the Government of New South Wales, with buses initially hired from White Transit Company. The service was an instant success with over 2,000 passengers carried on the first day alone.

Route 144 has been extended multiple times from its original terminus at Cremorne Junction. On 1 April 1933, route 144 was extended to St Leonards, on 15 April 1965 to Royal North Shore Hospital. and on 11 September 1988 to Chatswood station. From 20 December 2020, route 144 ceased to divert via Royal North Shore Hospital.

In October 2021 it was included in the takeover of region 8 by Keolis Downer Northern Beaches.

Current route
Route 144 operates via these primary locations:
Manly wharf
Balgowlah
The Spit
Cremorne
Neutral Bay
Crows Nest
St Leonards station
Gore Hill
Artarmon
Chatswood station

References

Bus routes in Sydney